Octomeria minor is a species of orchid endemic to the Guyanas.

minor